Chandak may refer to:

 Nikita Chandak, Nepalese model and beauty pageant titleholder
 Pankaj Chandak, Indian-born British surgeon
 Chandak Sengoopta, British professor

See also
 Chandaka Elephant Sanctuary
 Chandakhar, Azerbaijan